Karen Margrethe Moe (born c. 1966) was the winner of the Frøken Norge competition 1985. She represented Kristiansand in the pageant to become Miss Norway and went on to compete in the Miss Universe 1985 pageant in the United States and the Miss World 1985 pageant in England. She did not place in either competition.

External links
 https://web.archive.org/web/20100330065818/http://www.pageantopolis.com/international/world_1985.htm

1960s births
Living people
Miss Universe 1985 contestants
Miss World 1985 delegates
Norwegian beauty pageant winners